The Wrath of the Lambs is the debut album by Nottingham alternative metal band illuminatus. The album was released through Anthill Records on May 26, 2008.  All songs were written by illuminatus, with all lyrics by Julio Taylor.

Track listing

Personnel
illuminatus
Julio Taylor - Vocals / Guitar
Jon Martin - Guitar
Felix Rullhusen - Drums
Mark Freestone - Bass
Dave Cheeseman - Piano & Keyboards

2008 debut albums
Illuminatus (band) albums